Dalírio Beber (born April 16, 1949) is a Brazilian politician. He has represented Santa Catarina in the Federal Senate since 2015. He is a member of the Brazilian Social Democracy Party.

References

Living people
1949 births
Members of the Federal Senate (Brazil)
Brazilian Social Democracy Party politicians